Munagapaka is a village in Anakapalli district in the state of Andhra Pradesh in India. Munagapaka pin code 531033. In Munagapaka there are nearly more than 2000 houses with population more than 8000. Munagapaka is under the Yelamanchili constituency. Munagapaka is also the mandal center for nearly 35 villages.

References

Villages in Anakapalli district